Marcelo Fabian Berza (born 28 July 1975) is an Argentine football defender. He currently plays for Gimnasia y Esgrima de Jujuy in the Primera B Nacional.

Berza was born in San Juan. He started his career in 1993 with Almirante Brown before moving to Banfield of the Argentine Primera in 1996. Banfield were relegated in 1997 but Berza stayed with the club.

In 1999 Berza played with Federal in Honduras before returning to Argentina in 2000 to play for his local team; San Martín de San Juan.

Between 2002 and 2003 Berza spent a season with Godoy Cruz in Mendoza before joining  Gimnasia de Jujuy. In 2005 Berza was part of the squad that won the 2nd division Clausura championship and obtained promotion to the Primera.

Titles

External links
  Argentine Primera statistics
  BDFA profile
 Football-Lineups player profile

1975 births
Living people
Sportspeople from San Juan Province, Argentina
Argentine footballers
Association football defenders
Club Atlético Banfield footballers
San Martín de San Juan footballers
Godoy Cruz Antonio Tomba footballers
Gimnasia y Esgrima de Jujuy footballers
Club Atlético Belgrano footballers
People from San Juan, Argentina